Pirahã may refer to:
 Pirahã people, an indigenous people of Brazil
 Pirahã language, the indigenous language of the Pirahã people